Robert Ray Hamilton (March 18, 1851 – August 23, 1890) was an American politician from New York.

Early life
He was the son of Gen. Schuyler Hamilton (1822–1903); grandson of John Church Hamilton (1792–1882); and great-grandson of Alexander Hamilton (1755/7–1804) and Elizabeth Schuyler Hamilton.

Robert Ray Hamilton graduated from Columbia College and Columbia Law School. He was admitted to the bar, and practiced law in New York City.

Career
He was a member of the New York State Assembly (New York Co., 11th D.) in 1881, 1886, 1887, 1888 and 1889.

Hamilton bought a half interest in a ranch owned by John Sargent in Idaho where he intended to live permanently. In May 1890, he left New York City for his ranch, to go hunting.

Personal life
In August 1889, it became known that he was married to Evangeline L. Mann (née Steele), a "notorious woman" who had ensnared him by claiming that he was the father of her child Beatrice. Evangeline Mann assaulted her maid, and was sentenced to two years in prison. In October 1889, Hamilton sued for divorce. He stated that the marriage had been performed on January 7, 1889, and told the truth about Beatrice which had been in fact some foundling used for the scheme to get money out of Hamilton (who had an income of about $40,000 a year inherited from his maternal grandfather Robert Ray). It was later proved in court that Eva had been married already to one Joshua L. Mann before she ever knew Hamilton, and Mann sued for divorce in 1893.

In September 1890, he was found dead in the Snake River, near the Southern end of Yellowstone Park, apparently having drowned and having been in the water for several days, making identification somewhat difficult. An investigation accused John I. Sergent of murdering Hamilton, but Sergent was found to be legally insane and was never prosecuted for the crime.

References

Sources
 The New York Red Book compiled by Edgar L. Murlin (published by James B. Lyon, Albany NY, 1897; pg. 501 and 505ff)
 Fourth Annual Record of Assemblymen and Senators from the City of New York in the State Legislature published by the City Reform Club (1889; pg. 46–50)
 "Very Costly Infatuation", The New York Times, August 30, 1889
 "Eva Asked For Morphine" The New York Times, September 6, 1889
 "Wants A Divorce" The New York Times, October 4, 1889
 "He Wants A Divorce" The New York Times, January 14, 1890
 "Death Has Divorced Them" The New York Times, September 15, 1890
 "Eva Begins Her Fight" The New York Times, January 13, 1891
 "Robert Ray Hamilton is Dead" The New York Times, January 29, 1891
 "Mr. Sargent Testifies" The New York Times, June 21, 1891
 "Mann Said to Be Insane" The New York Times, March 28, 1893
 "John I. Sargent Insane" The New York Times, December 28, 1899

1851 births
1890 deaths
Politicians from New York City
Republican Party members of the New York State Assembly
Columbia Law School alumni
Accidental deaths in Idaho
Deaths by drowning in the United States
American people of Dutch descent
Schuyler family
Robert Ray
Columbia College (New York) alumni
19th-century American politicians